Greendale is an unincorporated community in Hocking County, in the U.S. state of Ohio.

History
A post office was established at Greendale in 1879, and remained in operation until 1939.

References

Unincorporated communities in Hocking County, Ohio
Unincorporated communities in Ohio